Charco is both a census-designated place (CDP) and a populated place in Pima County, Arizona, United States. The population was 52 at the 2010 census.

Geography
Charco is located at  (32.247321, −112.600116).

Demographics

As of the 2010 census, there were 52 people living in the CDP: 27 male and 25 female. 15 were 19 years old or younger, 15 were ages 20–34, 7 were between the ages of 35 and 49, 12 were between 50 and 64, and the remaining 3 were aged 65 and above. The median age was 31.0 years.

The racial makeup of the CDP was 98.1% Native American, and 1.9% Other.  11.5% of the population were Hispanic or Latino of any race.

There were 17 households in the CDP, 10 family households (58.8%) and 7 non-family households (41.2%), with an average household size of 3.06. Of the family households, there were 0 married couples living together, 3 single fathers, and 7 single mothers. Of the non-family households, 4 were a single person living alone, 3 male and 1 female.

The CDP contained 26 housing units, of which 17 were occupied and 9 were vacant.

References

Census-designated places in Pima County, Arizona